Ljungby IF is a Swedish football club located in Ljungby. The club was founded on 1 April 1914.

Background
Since their foundation Ljungby IF has participated mainly in the middle and lower divisions of the Swedish football league system.  Their greatest sporting success came in 1999 when the club played a crucial qualifier for the Superettan against Östers IF before 3,725 spectators. Östers only won after extra time. Ljungby IF currently plays in Division 2 Södra Götaland which is the fourth tier of Swedish football. They play their home matches at the Lagavallen in Ljungby.

The club is the largest football club in Småland and is known for its large investment on the youth side supporting approximately 900 players of which around 250 are girls.

Ljungby IF are affiliated to the Smålands Fotbollförbund.

Season to season

Footnotes

External links
 Ljungby IF – Official website
 Lagavallen - Nordic Stadiums

Sport in Kronoberg County
Football clubs in Kronoberg County
Association football clubs established in 1914
1914 establishments in Sweden